Kellyn is a given name that may refer to:

Kellyn Acosta (born 1995), American soccer player
Kellyn Beck, designer of video game Defender of the Crown
Kellyn George, Dominican medical researcher
Kellyn Morris (born 1989), Australian actress and singer
Kellyn Plasschaert (1958–2009), American actress
Kellyn Tate (born 1976), American softball coach
Kellyn Taylor (born 1986), American distance runner